Sheikh Salahuddin Jewel is a Bangladesh Awami League politician and the incumbent Member of Parliament from Khulna-2. He is a nephew of Bangabandhu Sheikh Mujibur Rahman and cousin of Prime Minister Sheikh Hasina.

Early life
Jewel is the second son of Sheikh Abu Naser, younger brother of Sheikh Mujibur Rahman. Prime Minister Sheikh Hasina is his cousin.

Career
Jewel's house was attacked on 30 October 2014 by individuals with firearms. No one was harmed in the attack. He was elected to Parliament on 30 December 2018 from Khulna-2 as a Bangladesh Awami League candidate.

References

Awami League politicians
Living people
11th Jatiya Sangsad members
Sheikh Mujibur Rahman family
Year of birth missing (living people)
Bangladeshi people of Arab descent